The San Diego Public Library is a public library system serving the city of San Diego, California.

History 

The San Diego Public Library was established on May 19, 1882, by an elected board of library trustees, one of whom was civic leader and philanthropist George Marston. The first location was rented space in the Commercial Bank building at Fifth and G streets, and the new library opened its doors to the public for the first time on July 15, 1882. San Diego was the first city west of the Mississippi River to receive a Carnegie Library grant. The grant was received in 1899 and the library built in 1902. The library moved to Eighth and E streets where the new Carnegie Library was constructed.

A notable librarian during this period was Clara Estelle Breed (1906–1994), who served as children's librarian at the downtown branch and was appointed City Librarian in 1945, a post she held for 25 years. She founded numerous branch libraries and established the Serra Cooperative Library System, which allows users to borrow books from other libraries in San Diego and Imperial counties. She maintained contact with many Japanese American children when they were interned with their families during World War II; her correspondence with those children is now on display at the Japanese American National Museum in Los Angeles.

Over the years, many branch libraries have also been opened throughout the City.

Central Library

In 1952, the Carnegie Library was demolished and a new Central Library was opened at the same location on June 27, 1954. That library closed permanently on June 9, 2013, to begin the 10-week process of transferring its 2.6-million-item collection to the new library.

In 2010, construction began on a new $184.9 million  Central Library at 330 Park Boulevard in downtown San Diego. This 9-story structure was designed by San Diego architect Rob Quigley. It opened on September 30, 2013. The library displays numerous books and collections, including the second largest collection of baseball memorabilia in the U.S. The collection is housed in the Sullivan Family Baseball Research Center.

The Central Library also houses a new charter high school, e3 Civic High School, which is billed as the only school in the United States to be housed within a library. The school serves grades 9 through 12. It opened on September 3, 2013 with an initial student body of 260 ninth and tenth graders. Additional grades were added in 2014 and 2015 resulting in a student body of approximately 500.

Services 

The San Diego Public Library system currently consists of the Central Library, 35 branch libraries, and an adult literacy program office (READ/San Diego).
Library cards are free to applicants who reside within the state of California or own property in the city of San Diego, and to men and women serving in the armed forces who are stationed within San Diego County. Library cards are permanent and must be renewed every two years. There is a $30 annual fee for a non-resident library card.

On the third floor of the Central Library is the new Innovation Lab that was originally funded by a state Library Services and Technology Act grant in 2013, when the Central Library opened. Since then, thanks to donations from the community, the lab has expanded and added additional machines. The new space was funded in part by the California State Library. Available equipment and resources from the Innovation Lab include:
 3D Printing & Scanning
 Silhouette Cameos/Vinyl Cutter
 Sewing & Embroidery Machines
 Milling Machine
 Laser Cutter
 Computers
 Maker Classes & Workshop

In fiscal year 2006, the Library system had a circulation of more than 7 million and more than 6 million visits by patrons. The San Diego Public Library was one of the first major library systems in the United States to offer free wireless Internet access at all of its locations, including the Central Library and branch libraries.

While testing the Spirit of St. Louis airplane in San Diego, Charles Lindbergh used the resources at the San Diego Public Library to plot the course for his historic solo flight across the Atlantic Ocean.

Renowned American sculptor Donal Hord bequeathed to the San Diego Public Library his lifelong collection of books and several sculptures in appreciation for the assistance he had received from library's staff over the years.

Branches 

Aside from the Central Library, the system includes the following 35 branches:

 Allied Gardens/Benjamin
 Balboa
 Carmel Mountain
 Carmel Valley
 City Heights/Weingart Branch Library & Performance Annex
 Clairemont
 College-Rolando
 Kensington-Normal Heights
 La Jolla/Riford
 Linda Vista
 Logan Heights
 Mira Mesa
 Mission Hills-Hillcrest/Harley & Bessie Knox
 Mission Valley
 Mountain View/Beckwourth
 North Clairemont
 North Park
 North University Community
 Oak Park
 Ocean Beach
 Otay Mesa-Nestor
 Pacific Beach/Taylor
 Paradise Hills
 Point Loma/Hervey
 Rancho Bernardo
 Rancho Peñasquitos
 San Carlos
 San Ysidro
 Scripps Miramar Ranch
 Serra Mesa-Kearny Mesa
 Skyline Hills
 Tierrasanta
 University Community
 University Heights
 Valencia Park/Malcolm X Branch Library & Performing Arts Center

See also 
 Althea Warren, head librarian, 1916–26

References

External links 

 
 Carnegie Libraries in California
 Sullivan Family Baseball Research Center

Carnegie libraries in California
Libraries in San Diego
Library buildings completed in 1902
Public libraries in California
1882 establishments in California